Canada Water is an area of the Docklands in south-east London. It is named after a freshwater lake and wildlife refuge. Canada Water tube, Overground and bus station is immediately north of the lake, along with Canada Water Library which overhangs the lake and Deal Porter Square. Surrey Quays Shopping Centre is also adjacent, sitting immediately to the south.  The surrounding area, which forms the town centre of Rotherhithe, is now increasingly known as Canada Water, after the transport interchange as much as the lake itself.

History and development

The lake is named after the former Canada Dock, of which Canada Water is the surviving northern third, and which was mainly used by ships from Canada. As with much of the Docklands, the Surrey Commercial Docks closed in the 1970s. During the 1980s, the London Docklands Development Corporation took over, and invested heavily in the redevelopment of the area. About half of Canada Dock was infilled and the Surrey Quays Shopping Centre built on top of it; the remainder was converted into the present lake and wildlife refuge. An ornamental canal, Albion Channel, was created (through the site of the now filled-in Albion Dock) linking Canada Water to Surrey Water, with the spoil used to create Stave Hill in nearby Russia Dock Woodland.

Following the earlier gentrification of the parts of Rotherhithe along the river, the extension of the Jubilee line in 1999 moved the focus to the area immediately around Canada Water.  The opening of the new Canada Water Underground station gave the area rapid connections to the rest of London, with Canary Wharf one stop, Westminster less than 10 minutes, and Bond Street around 15 minutes away by underground train.  The station's connection to the London Overground network in 2010 has added a quick connection to the City of London, with a journey of around 10 minutes to Shoreditch High Street station, near Liverpool Street Station.

Much of the area is now going through a phase of rapid development, with new residential developments, a new library which opened in November 2011, cafés and restaurants planned around the lake, and plans to redevelop the shopping mall in a first step towards creating a more traditional town centre. Canada Water Surrey Quays lends its name to local property developer CWSQ.

Freshwater lake
Canada Water is the only body of fresh water in London Docklands. The lake is now kept topped up with fresh water using a windpump.  This  arrangement was put in place following research by the Landscape Architect Fraser Borwick, which revealed that ground water had historically been extracted to supply various industrial processes using wind power.  After checking the borehole results of the Jubilee line construction team, it was established that large amounts of potable water were available, and a borehole 80 metres long was sunk into the ground.  The borehole is lined for 60 metres, and the bottom 20 metres is into chalk.  The investigation of how best to keep the lake topped up with fresh water was the result of some damage to the lining of the old dock during construction works in the 1980s.  Another solution considered involved securing a water supply from the flooded tunnels of London Underground, but this was considered too risky.

Places nearby 

Surrey Quays Shopping Centre
Greenland Dock
Rotherhithe
Russia Dock Woodland
St. Mary's Church, Rotherhithe
Stave Hill (including Ecological Park)
Swedish Seamen's Church
Southwark Park
Bacon's College
Brunel Museum
Printworks London

References

External links

Canada Water Redevelopment promotional website
Canada Water Consultative Forum & Canada Water Campaign

London docks
Geography of the London Borough of Southwark
Redevelopment projects in London
Rotherhithe